1987 in professional wrestling describes the year's events in the world of professional wrestling.

List of notable promotions 
These promotions held notable shows in 1987.

Calendar of notable shows

Tournaments and accomplishments

JCP

WWF

Slammy Awards

Awards and honors

Pro Wrestling Illustrated

Wrestling Observer Newsletter

Title changes

WWF

Births

 January 5 – Willie Mack
 January 7 – Alisha Edwards
 January 15:
Kelly Kelly
Nicole Matthews
 January 30 – Becky Lynch
 February 1 - Ronda Rousey
 March 1 – Kyle O'Reilly
 March 9 - Aubrey Edwards 
 March 17 - Brody King 
 March 19 – AJ Lee
 March 30 - Trent Beretta 
 April 22 - Yusuke Kodama 
 April 23 – Donovan Dijak
 April 28 – Drew Gulak
 April 29 - Brittney Savage 
 May 2 - Pat McAfee 
 May 7 – Angélico
 May 11 – Lince Dorado
 May 17 – Dash Wilder
 May 23 – Bray Wyatt
 May 26 - Steve Maclin 
 July 7 - Richie Steamboat
 July 9 – Mini Charly Manson
 July 14 - Charly Caruso
 July 20 - Evil Uno 
 July 24 - Zack Sabre Jr.
 July 28 - Lindsay Kay Hayward
 August 11 - Chris Dickinson 
 August 14 – Johnny Gargano
 August 22 – Apollo Crews
 September 1 - Sami Callihan
 September 3 - Allie
 September 4 – Wesley Blake 
 September 5 - A. R. Fox 
 September 15 - Rhett Titus 
 September 21 - Ivelisse Vélez 
 October 7 – Aiden English
 October 23 – Carmella
 October 26 - Portia Perez
 November 2 – Samir Singh
 November 3 - Cameron 
 November 5 - Allysin Kay 
 November 8 - Kazuchika Okada 
 November 22 – Elias
 November 30 – Naomi
 December 7 – A. C. H.
 December 27 - Andy Leavine

Debuts
Uncertain debut date
Trudy Adams
Hardcore Holly
Balls Mahoney
John Tenta
Firebreaker Chip 
June 26 - Mark Calaway

Retirements
 Tony Garea (1971–1987)
 Armand Rougeau (1982–1987)
 Bob Boyer (wrestler) (1950s-1987) 
 Bob Sweetan (1966–1987)
 Bruno Sammartino (1959–1987)
 David Schultz (1974–1987)
 Huracan Ramirez (1941–1987)
 Ivan Putski (1968–1987)
 Kelly Kiniski (1980–1987)
 Killer Khan (1971–1987)
 Ron Fuller (1973–1987)
 Klondike Bill (1958–1987)
 Moose Cholak (1952–1987)
 Nick Bockwinkel (1955–1987)
 Paul Boesch (1938–1987)
 Pedro Morales (1959–1987)
 Rene Goulet (1957–1987)
 Super Maxx (1981–1987)
 Superstar Billy Graham (1970–1987)
 Tony Marino (1954–1987)
 Tor Kamata (1959–1987)
 Al Costello (1938–1987)

Deaths 
Unknown - Milton Reid, 69 or 70 (born 1917) 
January unknown date - Atholl Oakeley, 86
January 10 - Steve Casey, 78
April 12:
Mike Von Erich, 23
Akram Pahalwan, 56 or 57 (born 1930) 
August 24 – Malcolm Kirk, 51
August 30 - Frank Stojack, 75
September 3 - Rusty Wescoatt, 76
September 5 – Scott Irwin, 35
October 22 - Lino Ventura, 68
November 28 – Kazuharu Sonoda, 31

See also
List of WCW pay-per-view events
List of WWF pay-per-view events

References

 
professional wrestling